Adam Keller (born 1955 in Tel Aviv-Yafo) is an Israeli peace activist who was among the founders of Gush Shalom, of which he is a spokesperson.

Political views

A long-standing supporter of Yesh Gvul, Keller has served several prison terms for refusing reserve military duty in the 1967-occupied territories.  In April-May 1988, Reserve Corporal Adam Keller was charged with "insubordination" and "spreading of propaganda harmful to military discipline" in that while on active military duty he had written on 117 tanks and other military vehicles graffiti with the text: "Soldiers of the IDF, refuse to be occupiers and oppressors, refuse to serve in the occupied territories!" 
as well as placing on electricity pylons in the military camp where he was serving - and on inside doors of the stalls in the officers' toilet - stickers with the slogans "Down with the occupation!". 

Keller was convicted and sentenced to three months imprisonment. Keller was an active member of Yesh Gvul, but declared that he had done his act on his own without consulting anybody else. For its part, the movement did not take responsibility for his act, but did provide his wife with the financial support given to the families of refusers.

In April 2004 he was a member of a Gush Shalom delegation who visited Palestinian National Authority leader Yasser Arafat at his headquarters in Ramallah to protest at what they claim was a death threat by Ariel Sharon, Israel's prime minister, against Yasser Arafat.

Published works
Keller is the author of Terrible Days: Social Divisions and Political Paradoxes in Israel (CYPRES Amstelveen 1987). Since 1983 he has been the editor of The Other Israel, a bi-monthly newsletter of the campaign for Israeli-Palestinian peace.

See also
Arab-Israeli conflict
List of Middle East peace proposals

References

External links
Adam Keller's blog
Keller interview on the Jerusalem  Post, August 23. 2013 

Living people
Israeli anti-war activists
1955 births
People from Tel Aviv
Israeli male writers